Saeed Khan (born 4 April 1982) is a Pakistani cricketer. He made his List A debut for Federally Administered Tribal Areas in the 2018–19 Quaid-e-Azam One Day Cup on 30 September 2018. He made his first-class debut for Federally Administered Tribal Areas in the 2018–19 Quaid-e-Azam Trophy on 3 October 2018.

References

External links
 

1982 births
Living people
Pakistani cricketers
Federally Administered Tribal Areas cricketers
Place of birth missing (living people)